Lauri Eero Ilmari Korpinen (born 28 April 1946) has served as Finnish Ambassador to Malaysia and Brunei since June 2004.

Korpinen started his career at the Ministry for Foreign Affairs in 1973. He has previously worked at the Finnish Consulate General in Hamburg, the Permanent Representation at Geneva and in Addis Ababa, Warsaw, Washington and London Embassies. Between 2000 and 2004, Korpinen served as Ambassador to Seoul, Republic of Korea.

References

Ambassadors of Finland to South Korea
Ambassadors of Finland to Malaysia
Ambassadors of Finland to Brunei
Permanent Representatives of Finland to the United Nations
1946 births
Living people